STklos is a Scheme implementation that succeeded STk. It is a bytecode compiler with an ad hoc virtual machine which aims to be fast as well as light.

STklos is free software, released under the GNU General Public License.

In addition to implementing most of R5RS, and a large part of R7RS, STklos supports:
 an object system based on CLOS with multiple inheritance, generic functions, multimethods and a MOP
 a module system
 easy connection with the GTK toolkit
 a low-level macro system that compiles macro expanders into bytecode (syntax-rules is also present as a high-level macro system)
 a full Numerical tower implementation, as defined in R7RS
 Unicode support
 Perl compatible regular expressions via PCRE library
 a simple foreign function interface via libffi
 being compiled as a library and embedded in an application
 native threads, using the  libpthread library. The API conforms to SRFI-18
 a number of SRFIs
 easy access to SLIB
 an HTTP client

Additional libraries are available through its package system ScmPkg.

References

External links
 STklos home page
 STklos documentation

Scheme (programming language) interpreters
Scheme (programming language) implementations